The Lower Swedish Cabin is an historic Swedish-style log cabin which is located on Creek Road in the Drexel Hill section of Upper Darby, Pennsylvania, along Darby Creek. The cabin may be one of the oldest log cabins in the United States and is one of the last cabins built by the Swedish settlers that remains intact.

History
The house was likely built sometime between 1640 and 1650 by Swedish/Finnish immigrants who were part of the New Sweden colony. During the early 1900s, film pioneer Siegmund Lubin filmed several movies at the site. Despite this being disputed, several local residents have evidence of being used as extras. The filming became such a distraction to the workers of the nearby mill, that the owner filed for an injunction to prevent Lubin filming during work hours.   

The house served as a private residence until 1937, when it was recorded by the Historic American Buildings Survey. In 1941, the cabin became the property of the township of Upper Darby. 

Afterwards, it was offered to local Girl Scouts who used it as a campsite for several years. Then, a series of Township-appointed tenants lived there until 1964. A partial attempt to fix-up the house was done for the Bicentennial in 1976. The building was added to the National Register of Historic Places in 1982. 

A full historical restoration and archeological excavation were completed in 1989. The site is now cared for by the Friends of the Swedish Cabin.

It may be visited from March through October, on Sundays from 1 - 4 pm. Admission is free. Donations are accepted.

See also
List of the oldest buildings in Pennsylvania
National Register of Historic Places listings in Delaware County, Pennsylvania

References

Ambrose, George. —'The Log Cabins of New Sweden.The New Sweden Centre, Wilmington, DE (2003).

Smith, Thomas R. Drexel Hill 1875-1912'. Life in Addingham and Garrettford/America's Clandestine Hollywood. Drexel Hill, PA (1980).

External links
Friends of the Swedish Cabin

 - survey from 1937 of a nearby log cabin of similar date and construction, since demolished

Houses on the National Register of Historic Places in Pennsylvania
Historic American Buildings Survey in Pennsylvania
Houses completed in 1700
Houses in Delaware County, Pennsylvania
Museums in Delaware County, Pennsylvania
Historic house museums in Pennsylvania
New Sweden
Swedish-American culture in Pennsylvania
National Register of Historic Places in Delaware County, Pennsylvania
1700 establishments in Pennsylvania